Turgut Özal is an underground rapid transit station on the M3 line of the Istanbul Metro. It is located in southern Başakşehir under Turgut Özal Boulevard. The station was named after Turgut Özal, the 8th President of Turkey. Turgut Özal was opened on 14 July 2013 and has an island platform serviced by two tracks.

Layout

References

Railway stations opened in 2013
Istanbul metro stations
Başakşehir
2013 establishments in Turkey